Yevgeni Nikolayevich Zarva (born 12 December 1962 in Rubtsovsk) is a former Russian football player.

His son Dmitri Zarva is a footballer as well.

References

1962 births
People from Rubtsovsk
Living people
Soviet footballers
FC Dynamo Barnaul players
FC Tobol Kurgan players
FC Tyumen players
FC Ural Yekaterinburg players
Russian footballers
Russian Premier League players
Association football forwards
Sportspeople from Altai Krai